This is a season-by-season list of records compiled by North Dakota in men's ice hockey.

The University of North Dakota has won eight NCAA Championship in its history, the most recent coming in 2016 (as of March, 2020).

Season-by-season results

Note: GP = Games played, W = Wins, L = Losses, T = Ties

* Winning percentage is used when conference schedules are unbalanced.

Footnotes

References

 
Lists of college men's ice hockey seasons in the United States
North Dakota Fighting Hawks ice hockey seasons